The 1st Regiment, Royal Canadian Horse Artillery is a regular artillery regiment of the Canadian Army. It is based at CFB Shilo. It forms part of the 3rd Canadian Division's 1 Canadian Mechanized Brigade Group.

Lineage 

 Originated on 1 December 1898, in Kingston, Ontario and Quebec City, Quebec, as the Royal Canadian Artillery (Field Division) of The Royal Canadian Artillery
 Redesignated on 1 June 1901, as the Royal Canadian Field Artillery
 Redesignated on 1 September 1905, as the Royal Canadian Horse Artillery
 Redesignated on 16 October 1946, as the 71st Regiment (Royal Canadian Horse Artillery)
 Redesignated on 7 July 1949, as the 1st Field Regiment, Royal Canadian Horse Artillery
 Redesignated on 18 June 1951, as the 1st Regiment, Royal Canadian Horse Artillery

Batteries 

 A (The Queen's) Battery, RCHA
 B Battery, RCHA
 C Battery, RCHA
 Z Battery, RCHA
 Headquarters and Services Battery

History

The South African War 
On 20 December 1899, the Royal Canadian Artillery (Field Division) mobilized the Brigade Division, Royal Canadian Artillery for active service and on 21 February 1900, the brigade embarked for South Africa. After arrival, its batteries provided field artillery support to the Imperial forces in the eastern Transvaal, north Cape Colony, Griqualand West and with the Rhodesian Field Force. On 21 January 1901, the active service brigade was disbanded.

The First World War 
On 6 August 1914, the Royal Canadian Horse Artillery was placed on active service for instructional and camp administration duties.

On 26 August 1914, the RCHA mobilized the Royal Canadian Horse Artillery Brigade, CEF and on 30 September 1914, the regiment embarked for Great Britain. On 20 July 1915, the regiment disembarked in France where it provided mobile field artillery support as part of the Canadian Cavalry Brigade in France and Flanders until the end of the war. On 23 October 1920, the brigade was disbanded.

The Second World War 
On 1 September 1939, the Royal Canadian Horse Artillery was mobilized for active service as the 1st Field Brigade, RCA, CASF. On 21 December 1939, the regiment was redesignated as 1st Field Regiment, RCA, CASF and embarked for Great Britain as part of the 1st Canadian Infantry Division. In June 1940, the regiment arrived in France as part of the Second British Expeditionary Force, reaching a point west of Le Mans before being ordered back to the UK. On 1 January 1941, the regiment was redesignated as 1st Field Regiment, RCHA, CASF. The regiment landed in Sicily in July 1943 and in Italy in September 1943, providing field artillery support for the 1st Canadian Infantry Division. In March 1945, the regiment moved with the I Canadian Corps to North West Europe where it served until the end of the war. On 25 August 1945, the overseas regiment was disbanded.

On 1 June 1945, a second Active Force component of the regiment was mobilized for service in the Pacific theatre of operations under the designation of the 1st Canadian Field Artillery Battalion, RCA, CASF. On 1 September 1945, the regiment was redesignated as the 2nd/1st Field Regiment, RCHA, CASF and again on 1 March 1946, as the 71st Regiment, RCHA, CASF. On 27 June 1946, the regiment was embodied in the Permanent Force.

In July 1949 the 71st Regiment (Royal Canadian Horse Artillery) became the 1st Field Regiment, Royal Canadian Horse Artillery.

Korean War 
From May 1952 to April 1953, 1 RCHA served in Korea as part of the 25th Canadian Infantry Brigade, 1st Commonwealth Division.

Commandants

Alliances 

  - 1st Regiment Royal Horse Artillery

References 

Artillery regiments of Canada
Military units and formations established in 1949